Passeig de Sant Joan is a major avenue in the Eixample and Gràcia districts of Barcelona. It was named after an older street carrying this name, also known as Passeig Nou, built in 1795 around the glacis of the Ciutadella fortress.

It starts at the Arc de Triomf, where it meets Avinguda de Vilanova, Carrer de Trafalgar and Passeig de Lluís Companys (its continuation towards the Parc de la Ciutadella), and continues westwards through the Eixample district until it reaches Travessera de Gràcia in the lower part of Gràcia.

Buildings and monuments
Verdaguer monument (1924) by Josep Maria Pericàs.
Església de Salesas (1882-1885) by Joan Martorell.
Arc de Triomf
Palau Macaya by Josep Puig i Cadafalch
Plaça Tetuan

Culture

Museums
Barcelona Sewer Museum (Museu del Clavegueram de Barcelona)

Other
Ateneu Enciclopèdic Popular - founded in 1902.
Biblioteca Pública Arús

Transport

Metro
Verdaguer (L4, L5)
Arc de Triomf (L1)

Bus

Line 6 Pg. Manuel Girona - Poblenou
Line 15 Hospital St. Pau - Collblanc
Line 19 El Port Vell - Sant Genís
Line 20 Estació Marítima - Pl. Congrés
Line 39 Barceloneta - Horta
Line 45 Pg. Marítim - Horta
Line 47 Pl. Catalunya - Canyelles
Line 50 Montjuïc - Trinitat Nova
Line 51 Pla de Palau - Ciutat Meridiana
Line 55 Parc de Montjuïc - Plaça Catalunya

See also
Passeig de Lluís Companys
List of streets and squares in Eixample

 Street names in Barcelona
 Urban planning of Barcelona

References

External links
Modernisme al Passeig de Sant Joan

Streets in Barcelona
Eixample
Gràcia
Odonyms referring to religion